William J. Ryan Estate, now Nissequogue Golf Club, is a national historic district located at Nissequogue in Suffolk County, New York.  The district includes the principal dwelling, now the club house designed by Bradley Delehanty.  The estate house was built in 1930 and is a two-story, brick structure with a five bay center block connected to perpendicular wings by hyphens. The entrance features a three bay projecting center section that rises to a pedimented roof gable; at the ridge is a circular attic window.

It was added to the National Register of Historic Places in 1993.

References

External links
Nissequogue Golf Club website

Houses on the National Register of Historic Places in New York (state)
Historic districts on the National Register of Historic Places in New York (state)
Houses completed in 1930
Houses in Suffolk County, New York
National Register of Historic Places in Suffolk County, New York